The Coppa Italia is an annual football cup competition established in Italy in 1922. The competition is open to all Serie A and Serie B clubs, as well as four teams from Serie C.

Since the first final between Vado and Udinese in 1922, 74 finals have taken place. There have been 40 single-match finals, one of which was replayed after the initial game ended in a goalless draw. On 30 occasions, the final two teams played against each other over two legs on a home-and-away basis. On four occasions, a final group of four teams played a double round-robin tournament to determine the winner. As of 2022, 26 different teams have competed in the final, with 16 of them winning the competition at least once. On 11 occasions, the winning team also won Serie A in the same season, thus making a domestic double. Inter Milan are the only team to win Serie A, Coppa Italia and UEFA Champions League in the same year, in 2010. The tournament was not held in the years 1923–1925, 1928–1935 and 1944–1957. It was recommenced in 1958, in conjunction with the UEFA project for a new competition, the European Cup Winners' Cup.

The Stadio Olimpico of Rome has hosted the most finals (40); since 2008, all finals have been held there in the form of a single-leg match, with the exception of the 2021 final, which was held at the Mapei Stadium – Città del Tricolore in Reggio Emilia. The cities to host the final the fewest times are Vado Ligure, Venice, Ancona, Vicenza and Reggio Emilia (once each). Juventus hold the record for the most wins with 14, the highest number of consecutive victories in the final (4), and most appearances in the final (21). AC Milan have lost the most finals (9). Of the teams who have participated in more than one final, Palermo and Hellas Verona share the worst win–loss record with three defeats and no victories each. Of the victorious teams, Atalanta have the lowest percentage of success, winning one out of five finals (20 percent). Two teams from outside the top league have won the cup: Vado in 1922 (from Promozione) and Napoli in 1962 (from Serie B).

The highest-scoring final was the first leg between Roma and Inter Milan in 2007, with eight goals. On seven occasions, the result was a goalless draw, four of which were a single-leg final. The match with the largest margin of victory was the second leg between Sampdoria and Ancona in 1994, which Sampdoria won 6–1. Seven finals have been decided by a penalty shoot-out, the most recent being between Napoli and Juventus in 2020. The current champions are Inter Milan, who beat Juventus 4–2 after extra time in the 2022 final.

List of finals 

 The "Season" column refers to the season the competition was held, and wikilinks to the article about that season.
 The wikilinks in the "Score" column point to the article about that season's final game.

Results by club

Notes

References

External links 
The Coppa Italia at LegaSerieA.com
Coppa Italia finals at RSSSF.com

Coppa Italia
Coppa Italia finals
 
Football in Italy
Annual events in Italy